Nelsonia canescens is a herbaceous plant species in the family Acanthaceae, with a substantial number of similar plant specimens now identified as synonyms.

Gallery

References 

Acanthaceae